Citation analysis is the examination of the frequency, patterns, and graphs of citations in documents. It uses the directed graph of citations — links from one document to another document — to reveal properties of the documents.  A typical aim would be to identify the most important documents in a collection.  A classic example is that of the citations between academic articles and books. For another example, judges of law support their judgements by referring back to judgements made in earlier cases (see citation analysis in a legal context). An additional example is provided by patents which contain prior art, citation of earlier patents relevant to the current claim.

Documents can be associated with many other features in addition to citations, such as authors, publishers, journals as well as their actual texts.  The general analysis of collections of documents is known as bibliometrics and citation analysis is a key part of that field. For example, bibliographic coupling and co-citation are association measures based on citation analysis (shared citations or shared references). The citations in a collection of documents can also be represented in forms such as a citation graph, as pointed out by Derek J. de Solla Price in his 1965 article "Networks of Scientific Papers".  This means that citation analysis draws on aspects of social network analysis and network science.

An early example of automated citation indexing was CiteSeer, which was used for citations between academic papers, while Web of Science is an example of a modern system which includes more than just academic books and articles reflecting a wider range of information sources. Today, automated citation indexing has changed the nature of citation analysis research, allowing millions of citations to be analyzed for large-scale patterns and knowledge discovery. Citation analysis tools can be used to compute various impact measures for scholars based on data from citation indices. These have various applications, from the identification of expert referees to review papers and grant proposals, to providing transparent data in support of academic merit review, tenure, and promotion decisions. This competition for limited resources may lead to ethically questionable behavior to increase citations.

A great deal of criticism has been made of the practice of naively using citation analyses to compare the impact of different scholarly articles without taking into account other factors which may affect citation patterns. Among these criticisms, a recurrent one focuses on "field-dependent factors", which refers to the fact that citation practices vary from one area of science to another, and even between fields of research within a discipline.

Overview

While citation indexes were originally designed for information retrieval, they are increasingly used for bibliometrics and other studies involving research evaluation. Citation data is also the basis of the popular journal impact factor.

There is a large body of literature on citation analysis, sometimes called scientometrics, a term invented by Vasily Nalimov, or more specifically bibliometrics. The field blossomed with the advent of the Science Citation Index, which now covers source literature from 1900 on. The leading journals of the field are Scientometrics, Informetrics, and the Journal of the Association for Information Science and Technology. ASIST also hosts an electronic mailing list called SIGMETRICS at  ASIST. This method is undergoing a resurgence based on the wide dissemination of the Web of Science and Scopus subscription databases in many universities, and the universally available free citation tools such as  CiteBase,  CiteSeerX, Google Scholar, and the former Windows Live Academic (now available with extra features as Microsoft Academic). Methods of citation analysis research include qualitative, quantitative and computational approaches. The main foci of such scientometric studies have included productivity comparisons, institutional research rankings, journal rankings  establishing faculty productivity and tenure standards, assessing the influence of top scholarly articles, tracing the development trajectory of a science or technology field, and developing profiles of top authors and institutions in terms of research performance.

Legal citation analysis is a citation analysis technique for analyzing legal documents to facilitate the understanding of the inter-related regulatory compliance documents by the exploration the citations that connect provisions to other provisions within the same document or between different documents. Legal citation analysis uses a citation graph extracted from a regulatory document, which could supplement E-discovery - a process that leverages on technological innovations in big data analytics.

History
In a 1965 paper, Derek J. de Solla Price described the inherent linking characteristic of the SCI as "Networks of Scientific Papers". The links between citing and cited papers became dynamic when the SCI began to be published online. The Social Sciences Citation Index became one of the first databases to be mounted on the Dialog system in 1972. With the advent of the CD-ROM edition, linking became even easier and enabled the use of bibliographic coupling for finding related records. In 1973, Henry Small published his classic work on Co-Citation analysis which became a self-organizing classification system that led to document clustering experiments and eventually an "Atlas of Science" later called "Research Reviews".

The inherent topological and graphical nature of the worldwide citation network which is an inherent property of the scientific literature was described by Ralph Garner (Drexel University) in 1965.

The use of citation counts to rank journals was a technique used in the early part of the nineteenth century but the systematic ongoing measurement of these counts for scientific journals was initiated by Eugene Garfield at the Institute for Scientific Information who also pioneered the use of these counts  to rank authors and papers.  In a landmark paper of 1965 he and Irving Sher showed the correlation between citation frequency and eminence in demonstrating that Nobel Prize winners published five times the average number of papers while their work was cited 30 to 50 times the average. In a long series of essays on the Nobel and other prizes Garfield reported this phenomenon.  The usual summary measure is known as impact factor, the number of citations to a journal for the previous two years, divided by the number of articles published in those years. It is widely used, both for appropriate and inappropriate purposes—in particular, the use of this measure alone for  ranking authors and papers is therefore quite controversial.

In an early study in 1964 of the use of Citation Analysis in writing the history of DNA, Garfield and Sher demonstrated the potential for generating historiographs, topological maps of the most important steps in the history of scientific topics. This work was later automated by E. Garfield, A. I. Pudovkin of the Institute of Marine Biology, Russian Academy of Sciences and V. S. Istomin of Center for Teaching, Learning, and Technology, Washington State University and led to the creation of the HistCite software around 2002.

Automatic citation indexing was introduced in 1998 by Lee Giles, Steve Lawrence and Kurt Bollacker and enabled automatic algorithmic extraction and grouping of citations for any digital academic and scientific document. Where previous citation extraction was a manual process, citation measures could now scale up and be computed for any scholarly and scientific field and document venue, not just those selected by organizations such as ISI. This led to the creation of new systems for public and automated citation indexing, the first being CiteSeer (now CiteSeerX, soon followed by Cora, which focused primarily on the field of computer science and information science. These were later followed by large scale academic domain citation systems such as the Google Scholar and Microsoft Academic. Such autonomous citation indexing is not yet perfect in citation extraction or citation clustering with an error rate estimated by some at 10% though a careful statistical sampling has yet to be done. This has resulted in such authors as Ann Arbor, Milton Keynes, and Walton Hall being credited with extensive academic output.  SCI claims to create automatic citation indexing through purely programmatic methods. Even the older records have a similar magnitude of error.

Citation impact

Citation analysis for legal documents

Citation analysis for legal documents is an approach to facilitate the understanding and analysis of inter-related regulatory compliance documents by exploration of the citations that connect provisions to other provisions within the same document or between different documents. Citation analysis uses a citation graph extracted from a regulatory document, which could supplement E-discovery - a process that leverages on technological innovations in big data analytics.

Controversies
E-publishing: due to the unprecedented growth of electronic resource (e-resource) availability, one of the questions currently being explored is, "how often are e-resources being cited in my field?" For instance, there are claims that On-Line access to computer science literature leads to higher citation rates, however, humanities articles may suffer if not in print.
 Self-citations: it has been criticized that authors game the system by accumulating citations by citing themselves excessively. For instance, it has been found that men tend to cite themselves more often than women.
Citation pollution: the infiltration of retracted research, or fake research, being cited in legitimate research, but negatively impacting on the validity of the research. It is due to various factors, including the publication race and the concerning rise in unscrupulous business practices related to so-called predatory or deceptive publishers, research quality, in general, is facing different types of threats.

See also 
 Google economy
 Journalology
 Main path analysis
 San Francisco Declaration on Research Assessment

Notes

References 

Analysis
Citation metrics